The 1989/90 NTFL season was the 69th season of the Northern Territory Football League (NTFL).

St Marys have won their 16th premiership title while defeating the Darwin Buffaloes in the grand final by 108 points.

Grand Final

References

Northern Territory Football League seasons
NTFL